Hornillos del Camino is a municipality located in the province of Burgos, Castile and León, Spain. According to the 2004 census (INE), the municipality has a population of 70 inhabitants.

The town is along the French Way, the most popular of the routes of the Way of St. James, the ancient pilgrimage route.

References

Municipalities in the Province of Burgos